Francis "Frank" Oliver  (born Francis Robert Oliver Bowsfield; September 1, 1853 – March 31, 1933) was a Canadian federal minister, politician, and journalist/publisher from the Northwest Territories and later Alberta. As Minister of the Interior, he was responsible for discriminatory Canadian government policies that targeted First Nations' land rights and Black immigration.

Early life
Oliver was born Francis Bowsfield in Peel County, Canada West, just west of Toronto. He was the son of Allan Bowsfield and Hannah (Anna) Lundy. Some disagreement in the family made him drop the name Bowsfield and adopt the name of his grandmother, Nancy Oliver Lundy.

Oliver studied journalism in Toronto, Ontario. In 1880, he moved west and founded the Edmonton Bulletin with his wife, Harriet Dunlop (1863–1943). When the first issue was printed on December 6, 1880, it became the first newspaper in what is now Alberta, and he owned it until 1923. Oliver was a member of the Edmonton Settlers' Rights Movement, which engaged in direct action to preserve rights of old-timers as squatters and homesteaders on land pre-Survey.

He also used the Edmonton Bulletin as a platform to voice his opposition to the establishment and continued existence of Papaschase Indian Reserve Number 136. He continued this practice for eight years, until the Papaschase were forced from their reserve by the federal government and the land was divided between railway companies, settlers, and Edmonton.

Political career
Oliver was elected to the North-West Council in 1883. He was the second elected member to the 1st Council of the Northwest Territories, winning the May 29, 1883 election for the newly formed Edmonton district. Oliver lost his seat in the 1885 Northwest Territories election to future Speaker Herbert Charles Wilson. 

Oliver contested and won one of the two seats in the Edmonton district in 1888. He retained his seat by acclamation in the 1891 and 1894 elections.  During Oliver's time as a territorial representative, he contributed to the creation of the North-West Territories' first public school system.

He resigned from the council in 1896 to run for a seat in the House of Commons of Canada for the Liberal Party of Canada. Running as a Liberal Party candidate, Oliver was a champion of the small farmer and businesspeople of the pioneering in Alberta at the time.  He was elected in the 1896 Canadian federal election to represent the entire Alberta (Provisional District). He was re-elected to the Alberta provisional district again in 1900. 

The large Alberta riding was broken up, and Edmonton acquired an MP for itself in 1904. Oliver was elected to the newly-formed Edmonton district in 1904 Canadian federal election.

Following his appointment to the federal cabinet, he retained the seat in a 1905 Ministerial by-election. He also was re-elected in the 1908 Canadian federal election and the 1911 Canadian federal election. 

As leading federal politician of western Prairies, Oliver was assigned by Wilfrid Laurier to draw up the electoral boundaries used in the 1905 Alberta general election. The boundaries were said to favour Edmonton, where the Alberta Liberal Party enjoyed the most support although overall, the Liberal Party got the majority of the votes cast and more votes than any other party in the election. Edmonton's political weight is said to have assured the city's designation as the provincial capital, if its central location and long dominance in north-central Alberta had not been enough.

Federal Minister
From 1905 to 1911, he was appointed and served as the Minister of the Interior in the federal cabinet and Superintendent-General of Indian Affairs.

Much of the land thus freed was declared to be forest reserves to capitalize on its timber and mineral resources.

Oliver, unhappy with centralized approach to the National Parks System, reorganized the system by creating the position of Commissioner of Dominion Parks with its headquarters in Banff, Alberta, and Howard Douglas, the superintendent of Rocky Mountains Park (Banff National Park) since 1897, was appointed the first Commissioner.

In 1907 he established a commission to investigate Doukhobor settlement in Saskatchewan. They had settled there on Clifford Sifton's promise that they could hold and work the land communally. The commission led to the reversal of Sifton's policy and the Doukhobors being disposessed of the land they had immigrated from Russia to settle.

By 1911, Oliver's immigration policy imposed tighter controls on immigration. Oliver was staunchly British, and his policies favoured nationality over occupation. He asserted that his immigration policy was more "restrictive, exclusive and selective" than those of his predecessors. Like his predecessor, Clifford Sifton, Oliver encouraged immigration from Europe, and encouraged immigration of experienced farmers from Ukraine and other parts of Eastern Europe. 

Oliver wrote Order-in-Council P.C. 1911-1324, which was approved by the Laurier Cabinet on August 12, 1911 under the authority of the Immigration Act, 1906. It was intended to keep out black Americans escaping segregation in the American South by stating that "the Negro race...is deemed unsuitable to the climate and requirements of Canada." The order was never called upon, as efforts by immigration officials had already reduced the number of blacks immigrating to Canada. Cabinet cancelled the order on 5 October 1911, the day before Laurier's government was replaced by the new Conservative government, The cancellation claimed that the Minister of the Interior was not present at the time of approval.

Oliver also used his newspaper to lobby for having the Papaschase Cree removed from their Treaty 6 Reserve territory, south of Edmonton, in 1880s.

Frank Oliver's public positions apparently suited local sentiment as he was elected to the Territorial Assembly and as MP multiple times, often with majority of votes in the district.

His later political career 
After the Liberal government was denied power in 1911, Olivere served in the House of Commons until 1917. 

He ran for re-election in the new riding of West Edmonton in 1917 and received the most votes cast in the riding. His lead though was eliminated when officials of Borden's party distributed its army vote and he did not retain the seat. 

Oliver ran in 1921 to regain his Edmonton West seat but this time he was defeated by a candidate of the United Farmers of Alberta.

Legacy 
The area of downtown Edmonton west of 109th Street was named Oliver Square after the man.

On August 2, 2021 the Toronto Daily Tribune story, "Edmonton’s Oliver Square changes name after community consultation." It reported, "A member of Parliament and federal minister first elected to office in 1883, Oliver is known for drafting discriminatory legislation, including policies that pushed Indigenous people off their traditional lands."

Mount Oliver in the Victoria Cross Ranges is named after him.

The Oliver Canadian Northern (now CNR) railway station in today's northeast Edmonton, and the surrounding neighborhood of same name, honours this man. The Alberta Hospital (Edmonton) is located in Oliver.

The Oliver School District (1899-1957) was named after him. This was done in recognition of Oliver, as NWT Assemblyman, having a great deal to do with the Act that established the school district system in the North-West Territories.

Death
Frank Oliver died in 1933 in Ottawa, Ontario.

His body was brought to Edmonton, and it was interred in the Edmonton Cemetery.

References

Bibliography

Notes

External links

 
 
 Frank Oliver, Manitoba Historical Society
 Frank Oliver and the 1905 election Alberta Heritage
 Frank Oliver and the Michel Band

Members of the Legislative Assembly of the Northwest Territories
1853 births
1933 deaths
Liberal Party of Canada MPs
Laurier Liberals
Members of the House of Commons of Canada from the Northwest Territories
Members of the House of Commons of Canada from Alberta
Members of the King's Privy Council for Canada
Persons of National Historic Significance (Canada)
Racism in Canada